Litohlavy ( or Litohlau) is a municipality and village in Rokycany District in the Plzeň Region of the Czech Republic. It has about 500 inhabitants.

Geography
It lies in the Švihov Highlands. Litohlavy is situated on both banks of the Voldušský Stream, which bisects the territory into two parts.

History
The first written mention of Litohlavy is from 1390. It belonged to the Rokycany domain from 1498 until 1850. In the 19th century, some iron ore mining developed in the territory of Litohlavy, however the village had mostly rural economy. In 1980–1994 the village was under administration of Rokycany.

Demographics

Transport
The D5 motorway Prague–Plzeň runs south of Litohlavy along the municipal border.

Sights

The main landmark is the Baroque Chapel of the Visitation of the Virgin Mary located on the Vršíček hill. It is a pilgrimage site built in 1744–1747.

References

External links

Villages in Rokycany District